Alison McDade (born 1950s) is a South African former professional tennis player.

Active on tour in the 1970s, McDade originally competed under her maiden name of Alison McMillan. Her most notable performance was a third round appearance at the 1977 Wimbledon Championships, where following a first round bye she defeated Michèle Gurdal, before being eliminated by Terry Holladay.

References

External links
 
 

1950s births
Living people
South African female tennis players